Sonko may refer to:

 Edrissa Sonko (born 1980), Gambian footballer
 Ibrahima Sonko (born 1981), Senegalese footballer
 Moustapha Sonko (born 1972), French basketball player
 Noah Sonko Sundberg (born 1996), Swedish footballer
 Ousman Sonko (born 1969), Gambian politician
 Pa Ousman Sonko (born 1984), Gambian footballer
 Yankuba Sonko, Gambian police officer